Juan Forn (November 5, 1959 – June 20, 2021) was an Argentine writer, translator, and editor.
He wrote four novels (Corazones cautivos más arriba, 1987, Frivolidad, 1995, Puras mentiras, and María Domecq, 2007), a compilation of short stories (Nadar de noche, 1989) and essays (La tierra elegida, 2005, and "Ningún hombre es una isla", 2010).

Notes

1959 births
2021 deaths
Argentine translators
Argentine male writers
Place of birth missing
People from Buenos Aires